First on Mars is a web application that aggregates links to cable and network TV shows available for free online viewing. TV shows are aggregated from over 60 sources including Hulu. Instead of negotiating licenses to the TV show content, First on Mars uses embeddable players provided by content owners. As of January, 2009, First on Mars indexed over 13,000 episodes and 600 shows. First on Mars is free to consumers and plans to generate revenue through on-site advertising.

History
First on Mars was founded in January 2008 by Tuhin Roy, who is currently serving as CEO. Prior to founding First on Mars, Roy founded music and TV content aggregator Digital Rights Agency and was a co-founder of Echo Networks, an online radio company. First on Mars received funding from angel investors and small investment funds in two rounds.

First on Mars was made available for public beta testing in September 2008, and its official launch was on December 10, 2008.  As of December 2008, First on Mars had 12 employees and consultants and is based in San Francisco. Version 1.5 was released on January 27, 2009, which added proprietary search functionality.

Technology
A patent application for First on Mars' proprietary guide technology was filed in September 2008. The guide is built using Adobe Flex and Ruby on Rails. As First on Mars users add shows, networks, and moods to their favorites, the First on Mars guide is personalized for each user. The guide can be further personalized with various graphical skins.

Content
TV shows are organized in several ways: by show, by network, or by mood. Shows are accessible from the major networks including ABC, CBS, NBC, and Fox, as well as others including Comedy Central, Disney Channel, HBO, PBS, and the History Channel. TV shows available include current programming such as Flight of the Conchords, 24, Desperate Housewives, and Family Guy, as well as new shows such as Important Things with Demetri Martin and classic shows including The Addams Family, I Dream of Jeannie, and Flipper.

See also 
 Television on demand

References

External links
First On Mars official website

American entertainment websites
Internet properties established in 2008